Mouat Street is a  street in Fremantle, Western Australia. Historically, the name was often spelled as Mouatt Street.

It is a one-way street, running from Phillimore Street in the north to Marine Terrace in the south. It runs parallel to and in between Cliff Street to the west and Henry Street to the east.
Along the way it intersects High Street and Croke Street.

New kerbing was laid along Mouat Street in 1890.

It is the location of a number of historical buildings: the Adelaide Steamship House, the Strelitz Buildings, the former Tarantella Night Club and the Howard Smith Building. There are also several buildings owned and used by the Fremantle campus of the University of Notre Dame, such as the former P&O Hotel building, as well as many other commercial buildings that use their heritage status.

Former buildings in the street include His Lordships Larder Hotel.

Notes

 
Streets in Fremantle
Articles containing video clips